The 1973 Washington Huskies football team was an American football team that represented the University of Washington during the 1973 NCAA Division I football season.  In its 17th season under head coach Jim Owens, the team compiled a 2–9 record, (0–7 in the Pacific-8 Conference, last), and was outscored 376 to 218.

The Huskies dropped the Apple Cup for the second straight year. The 52–26 loss at Husky Stadium was Washington's worst home loss in the series until 2021; they rebounded and won the next eight, through 1981.

Junior defensive lineman Dave Pear was selected as the team's most valuable player.

Schedule

Roster

Season summary

Washington State

Chris Rowland 16/36, 354 Yds

NFL Draft selections
One University of Washington Husky was selected in the 1974 NFL Draft, which lasted seventeen rounds with 442 selections.

References

Washington
Washington Huskies football seasons
Washington Huskies football